The Philippine House Special Committee on Bicol Recovery and Economic Development is a special committee of the Philippine House of Representatives.

Jurisdiction 
As prescribed by House Rules, the committee's jurisdiction is on the policies and programs to promote and enhance the development of the Bicol region including developmental projects, care programs and the Bicol river basin project.

Members, 18th Congress

See also 
 House of Representatives of the Philippines
 List of Philippine House of Representatives committees

References

External links
House of Representatives of the Philippines

Bicol Recovery and Economic Development
Bicol Region